The Organ is a quarterly magazine about the world of the pipe organ. It is based in London, United Kingdom, but features organs in other countries too. It was established in 1921 as a sister-publication of Musical Opinion. The publisher is the company Musical Opinion Ltd. Its editor-in-chief has been Robert Matthew-Walker.

References

External links
 

Music magazines published in the United Kingdom
Magazines established in 1921
Quarterly magazines published in the United Kingdom
English-language magazines